Frederick Julius Pohl (August 18, 1889 – February 21, 1991) was a prolific playwright, literary critic, editor and book writer. He is best known for his books espousing speculative and controversial historical theories of Pre-Columbian trans-oceanic contact by Europeans, including the Vikings and others.

Pohl was the husband of playwright/author Josephine McIlvain Pollitt (October 15, 1890 - August 1978; married Frederick in May 1926) and later Loretta M. Baker (née Champagne, 1906 - April 27, 2002; married Frederick in 1980).  He graduated from Amherst College in 1911 and from Columbia University in 1914 with a Master of Arts.

Other works
 Cook, F. A., ed., Return from the Pole (New York: Pellegrini & Cudahy, 1951).
 Amerigo Vespucci: Pilot Major (New York: Octagon Books, 1966).
 Like to the Lark:  The Early Years of Shakespeare (New York: Clarkson N. Potter, 1972).
 William Shakespeare:  A Biography (Rochester, NY:  Dupont Books, 1983).
 The New Columbus (Rochester, NY: Dupont Books, 1986).

References

External Links 

 Frederick J. Pohl (AC 1911) Papers at the Amherst College Archives & Special Collections

American book editors
1889 births
1991 deaths
Pre-Columbian trans-oceanic contact
American literary critics
20th-century American historians
20th-century American male writers
Amherst College alumni
Columbia University alumni
20th-century American dramatists and playwrights
American centenarians
Men centenarians
American male non-fiction writers